Tivaouane Department is one of the 45 departments of Senegal, and one of the three in the Thiès Region. Its capital is Tivaouane.

The department has three urban communes: Mboro, Meckhe and Tivaouane.

The rural districts (communautés rurales) comprise:
Arrondissement of Mérina Dakhar:
 Mérina Dakhar
 Koul
 Pékèsse
Arrondissement of Méouane:
 Méouane
 Darou Khoudoss
 Taïba Ndiaye
Arrondissement of Niakhène:
 Niakhène
 Mbayène
 Thilmakha
 Ngandiouf
Arrondissement de Pambal
 Notto Gouye Diama
 Mont Rolland
 Pire Goureye
 Chérif Lo

Historic sites 

 Tivaouane railway station
 Building housing the Prefecture (old residence of the Commandant of the Cayor) Circle
 Village of Longhor, historic and religious site
 Villages of Soughère and Nguiguis, historical sites, secondary capitals of the Damels of Cayor
 Village of Mboul, historic site, capital of the Damels
 Mausoleum of Khaly Madiakhaté Kala at Keur Makala, Arrondissement of Niakhène
 Mosque and Zawia of El Hadji Malick Sy (first constructed in 1904)
 Serigne Babacar Sy Mosque 
 Mosquée et Zawia of the Kounta Family of Ndiassane
 Grand Mosque of Pire
 Mausoleum of Khaly Amar Fall at Pire

References

Departments of Senegal
Thiès Region